House Gang is an Australian television comedy that screened on the Special Broadcasting Service. The first series of six episodes screened in 1996 and the second series of six episodes screened in 1998.

Synopsis
The series features the formerly wealthy, habitually dysfunctional family of Mike Wilson and his contentious 15-year-old daughter Chloe. Mike, a builder who has gone bankrupt, and his daughter Chloe decide to move in with their tenants, a trio of handicapped young adults named Belinda (Ruth Cromer), Trevor (Saxon Graham), and Robert (Chris Greenwood), and their special-ed teacher Jack (Jeanette Cronin). At first, appalled by their new roommates, the Wilsons soon discovered that they had a lot to learn from the industrious housemates.

Cast
 Chris Haywood as Mike 
 Ruth Cromer as Belinda  
 Saxon Graham as Trev  
 Chris Greenwood as Robert 
 Jocelyn Rosen as Chloe  
 Jeanette Cronin as Jack 
Lynda Gibson as Julie
 Tracie Sammut as Donna

References

External links 
 

Special Broadcasting Service original programming
1996 Australian television series debuts
1998 Australian television series endings
Television shows set in New South Wales
Australian comedy television series